Pons (II) William (1019–1060) was the Count of Toulouse from 1037. He was the eldest son and successor of William III Taillefer and Emma of Provence. He thus inherited the title marchio Provincæ. He is known to have owned many allods and he relied on Roman, Salic, and Gothic law.

Already in 1030, he possessed a lot of power in the Albigeois. In 1037, he gave many allodial churches and castles, including one half of that of Porta Spina, in the Albigeois, Nimois, and Provence as a bridal gift to his wife Majore.

In 1038, he split the purchase of the Diocese of Albi with the Trencavel family. In 1040, he donated property in Diens to Cluny. In 1047, he first appears as count palatine in a charter donating Moissac to Cluny.

Pons married his first wife, Marjorie (d.1044), in 1022.
They had;
Pons the Younger, did not inherit his county or march.

In 1040, he married, Almodis de La Marche, former wife of Hugh V of Lusignan, but he too repudiated her in 1053. 
They had:
William IV, Count of Toulouse
Raymond IV, Count Saint-Gilles, succeeded his brother. 
Hugh, abbot of Saint-Gilles 
Almodis, married Pierre, Count of Melgueil

Pons died in Toulouse and was buried in Saint-Sernin, probably late in 1060 or early in 1061.

Notes

References

Sources

Lewis, Archibald R. The Development of Southern French and Catalan Society, 718–1050. University of Texas Press: Austin, 1965.

Counts of Toulouse
991 births
1060 deaths
Place of birth unknown
House of Rouergue